Isabella Arcila Hurtado (born 11 March 1994) is a Colombian swimmer. She competed in the women's 50 metre freestyle event at the 2016 Summer Olympics. She competed at the 2020 Summer Olympics.

References

External links
 

1994 births
Living people
Colombian female swimmers
Olympic swimmers of Colombia
Swimmers at the 2016 Summer Olympics
Swimmers at the 2010 Summer Youth Olympics
South American Games silver medalists for Colombia
South American Games medalists in swimming
Competitors at the 2018 South American Games
Central American and Caribbean Games gold medalists for Colombia
Central American and Caribbean Games silver medalists for Colombia
Central American and Caribbean Games bronze medalists for Colombia
Competitors at the 2014 Central American and Caribbean Games
Competitors at the 2018 Central American and Caribbean Games
Swimmers at the 2011 Pan American Games
Swimmers at the 2015 Pan American Games
Swimmers at the 2019 Pan American Games
Central American and Caribbean Games medalists in swimming
Colombian female freestyle swimmers
Pan American Games competitors for Colombia
Swimmers at the 2020 Summer Olympics
Sportspeople from Cali
20th-century Colombian women
21st-century Colombian women